EIP may refer to:

 Eco-industrial park
 Economic impact payment (disambiguation), a name for several different tax rebates, tax credits, or tax deductions from the U.S. government
 EIP register, in the IA-32 architecture
 Eipo language
 Electoral Integrity Project
 Enterprise information portal
 Enterprise Integration Patterns, a book by Gregor Hohpe and Bobby Woolf
 Environmental Integrity Project, an American non-profit
 Estonian Independence Party, a political party in Estonia
 Ethereum Improvement Proposal, a proposal to improve the quality of Ethereum cryptocurrency software 
 European Institute of Peace
 Entrepreneurship and Innovation Programme of the European Commission's Competitiveness and Innovation Framework Programme